Reagan Noble (born 22 July 1983 in Johannesburg, Gauteng) is a South African footballer, who currently plays for University of Pretoria F.C.

Career
The midfielder played previously for Wits University, Mamelodi Sundowns, Bloemfontein Celtic, Ikapa Sporting and AmaZulu in the Premier Soccer League.

International career
He was a participant at the 2005 CONCACAF Gold Cup in the United States for South Africa.

Notes

1983 births
South African soccer players
Living people
Soccer players from Johannesburg
Association football midfielders
Bidvest Wits F.C. players
AmaZulu F.C. players
Bloemfontein Celtic F.C. players
South Africa international soccer players
Cape Coloureds
Mamelodi Sundowns F.C. players
2005 CONCACAF Gold Cup players
University of Pretoria F.C. players
Ikapa Sporting F.C. players